Blackmer is a surname. Notable people with the surname include:

David E. Blackmer, audio engineer
Sidney Blackmer (1895–1973), American actor
Fulton-Mock-Blackmer House, also called Blackmer House
Suzanne Blackmer, American actress

See also
Blackmer v. United States